County Coleraine, called the County of Colerain in the earliest documents, was one of the counties of Ireland from 1585 to 1613. It was named after its intended county town, Coleraine.

Foundation and extent

Sir John Perrot, the Lord Deputy of Ireland, established County Coleraine between the Rivers Bann and Foyle in 1585 during the reign of Elizabeth I. Sir John intended administering the new county from the town of Coleraine. In the event, the English authorities built the courthouse and jail for the new establishment at Desertmartin in the adjacent county of Tyrone. Sir Thomas Phillips was appointed Governor of the County of Coleraine in 1611.

Towards a new county

English control of the territory remained nominal until after the Nine Years' War. Following the Flight of the Earls (1607) and O'Doherty's Rebellion (1608), the lands the Irish aristocrats held were escheated to the Crown. In 1609 the territory was given to the City of London Corporation and its livery companies, who received instructions to undertake its plantation.

The area for planting included:

 the entirety of County Coleraine
 the barony of Loughinsholin which comprised the then north of County Tyrone and the environs of Coleraine in County Antrim, together called O'Cahan's Country
 a small area of County Donegal around Lough Foyle

In 1613, this larger area became incorporated into the newly founded County Londonderry, although its county town was Coleraine.

References

History of County Londonderry
History of County Tyrone
History of County Donegal
Coleraine
States and territories established in 1585
1613 disestablishments
Former counties of Ireland